Storm Constantine (12 October 1956 – 14 January 2021) was a British science fiction and fantasy author, primarily known for her Wraeththu series, which began as one trilogy but has spawned many subsequent works.

Beginning in the 1980s, Constantine's short stories appeared in dozens of genre fiction magazines and anthologies. She was the author of over 30 published novels and non-fiction books (often examining issues of sex and gender), plus numerous other publications, including magical grimoires. Her debut novel, The Enchantments of Flesh and Spirit, was nominated for a Lambda Literary Award, and subsequently her work was nominated for the British Science Fiction Award, the British Fantasy Award, the Locus Award and the Otherwise Award.

In addition to her work as a writer, Constantine headed Immanion Press, an independent publishing company she founded in 2003 to publish both  her own back catalogue and works of other niche fiction and non-fiction writers.

Early life 
The author, who chose the pen name Storm Constantine, was born 12 October 1956 in Stafford, Staffordshire. She began creating stories and art at an early age, devising make-believe worlds and writing sequels to Greek and Roman myths. "Before I learned to write as a young child, I made stories up in my head", she told an interviewer in 2017. "I embellished reality always and often got into trouble for it. I simply had a natural impulse to make things up and it's been part of me all my life."

Education and pre-writing career 
After completing her primary education, Constantine entered art school, but decided to leave before completing her degree, frustrated with the institution's disdain for figurative art. In the early 1980s, she joined the Goth sub-culture in and around Birmingham, eventually developing friendships with several bands and later managing a few. She later cited her years in this scene as a strong influence for her Wraeththu series, explaining to an interviewer that the people around her "were all very androgynous" and to her "seemed like fantasy creatures". Her primary day-job was working at the Stafford public library.

Wraeththu 
Constantine began her serious writing career by writing a novel which became the Wraeththu trilogy, (The Enchantments of Flesh and Spirit, The Bewitchments of Love and Hate, The Fulfillments of Fate and Desire, collectively known as the Wraeththu Chronicles). She came to the decision to throw herself into writing when, working at the library, she came to a realization: "This is it for the rest of my life. I’ve got to do something about it." Constantine had been working with the concept and characters of Wraeththu since the late 1970s.

Constantine had a synopsis and outline completed when in the late 1980s she was at the Andromeda bookshop in Birmingham (operated by Rog Peyton) and had a chance encounter with a representative from MacDonald Futura (absorbed by Little, Brown Book Group in 1992), who subsequently picked up the novels, which were published 1987-1989. Enchantments of Flesh and Spirit was nominated for the 1991 Lambda Literary Awards for category "Gay science fiction, fantasy or horror." In 1993, the trilogy was released in omnibus format by Tor in the United States. Beginning at the time of release and continuing on for decades, the trilogy developed a cult following, particularly in the Goth subculture among those interested in fiction tackling alternative sexuality.

Beginning with the initial trilogy, and continuing on to subsequent novels, novellas, and short stories, the story of Wraeththu follows the rise of a race of hermaphrodites / androgynes transformed from men. This new race takes possession of a world decline, a slow apocalypse, and then rebuilds the world into something better. Members of the new species are referred to as hara. The world of Wraeththu includes representations of real-life Earth continents and cultures, but all have been renamed and reworked. Constantine described the setting as an "alternate reality".

Constantine framed the Wraeththu as follows:

Humanity is in decline, ravaged by insanity, natural disasters, conflict, disease and infertility. A mysterious new race has risen from the ghettos and ruins of the decaying, dying cities. The young are evolving into a new species, which is stronger, sharper and more beautiful than their forerunners. Androgynous beings, they transcend gender and race. They possess skin psychic abilities and the means, through a process called inception, to transform humans into creatures like themselves. But they are wild in their rebirth and must strive to overcome all that is human within them in order to create society anew. They are the Wraeththu.

The structure and plot of the Wraeththu Chronicles revolves around three characters: Pellaz ("Pell"), Swift, and Calanthe ("Cal"), who are (in that order) the first-person narrators. Their intertwining stories begin with Cal meeting Pell and whisking him away to a town where he is incepted and becomes har. Eventually the couple, deeply in love, encounter Swift, a Wraeththu child living in the home of a high-ranking tribal leader. Shortly after their visit, Pell is killed. All is not as it seems, however, and Pell is "reborn" and becomes the Tigron of Immanion, ruler the Gelaming tribe. Swift's narrative, a coming-of-age story, tells the tale of what happened after Pell and Cal left, and then what happened when Cal returned, devastated by the loss of Pell. In the third book, set a couple of decades later, Cal pieces together the shattered memories of his life and embarks on a quest to reunite with Pell, who he has learned is alive. At the end of the book, Cal enters arrives in Immanion and claims Pell once again as his own. Pell has already bonded with another har and sired. And although the other har is angry, by the finale, the three hara become joint rulers of the Gelaming and by extension the Wraeththu race.

In subsequent works, including a trilogy intersecting with the first, several novels, and many short stories, Constantine further developed Wraeththu, in particular their evolution into fully realized, androgynous beings. After beginning their lives as rebellious teenagers and subsequently inheriting the world, they must take responsibility. In a 2016 interview, Constantine reflected:

Wraeththu are simply how the human race would be if I could design it myself: androgynous, beautiful (mostly), magical and housed in a more efficient vehicle of flesh and blood. Yet Wraeththu hara are not stainless; they are flawed. What makes them different from humanity – apart from their androgyny and improved physical/psychic being – is that they have a clean slate to start anew. Longevity helps them; humans, being frail creatures, become infirm and die just as they reach the threshold to real wisdom. Hara might have risen from a brutal start, but have a greater capacity to rise above it, to reach their potential. A world without villains and conflict, from a fictional point of view, would be pretty dull, so the mythos has to include those aspects. Wraeththu aren’t perfect, but to me they are better than what came before.

Name change 
In the late 1980s she began using the name Storm Constantine, at first as a pen name but eventually proceeding with a legal name change. Asked about her name in a 2010 interview, she said, "I feel that as people grow up, they don't always fit the names they've been given by their parents. So I decided quite early on that I wanted a different name. I chose one I felt would give me assertiveness and confidence."

Work in the 1990s 
Following the success of Wraeththu, Constantine embarked on a decade of high productivity which included the publication of two fantasy trilogies, a science fiction duet and six stand-alone novels, including Silverheart, a collaboration with Michael Moorcock. The Grigori trilogy is a modern-day fantasy tale in which characters connect back with the mysterious Nephilim, referred to in the books as Grigori. The Magravandias trilogy is a more conventional fantasy tale, with nobles, castles, medieval warfare and dragons. The Artemis duet is a science fiction tale about a colony world where radical feminism has gone disastrously wrong, with males having been made completely subservient. The remaining stand-alone novels are genre works which fall under the genres of cyberpunk, dark fantasy and science fiction. Constantine's short stories were widely printed in genre fiction magazines, which during the decade were thriving, and in larger print anthologies (see bibliography under Contributor). With the publication of so many novels and stories, Constantine's cult following grew and she began to appear at many science fiction and fantasy conventions in the United Kingdom as well as Dragon Con in the United States.

During this time period, Constantine also founded a fiction magazine with Jamie Spracklen, called Visionary Tongue, through which she published fiction by Freda Warrington, Graham Joyce and Tanith Lee.

Immanion Press and subsequent work 

With the dawn of the 21st century and the rise of the Internet, Constantine found herself connecting with fans online and realized that interest in Wraeththu remained high. This led to a decision to embark on a second trilogy (Wraeththu Histories), following up on events and characters in the Wraeththu Chronicles. While she was able to sell the idea to a publisher in the United States, she was not able to find a publisher in her home country. Wanting to release both the new books as well as revised editions of the original trilogy, in 2003 Constantine founded Immanion Press, an option that became commercially viable with the arrival of affordable and efficient print-on-demand services.

While Constantine continued to publish new books and re-issues of her own works, she managed Immanion Press as a full-fledged publishing operation, taking submissions from both fiction and non-fiction authors. A steady catalogue emerged along with a stable of authors and artists. While the company was able to attract several prominent authors, including Tanith Lee and David Barnett, for the most part the fiction side of the house lost money and after a few years Constantine opted to focus more on esoteric non-fiction, covering such topics as paganism, magic, myth and mythology and Reiki.

With the publication of Histories and the revised Chronicles, fans of Wraeththu emerged as an enthusiastic community online. Numerous web sites emerged, including an online zine and a fan fiction archive. Constantine regularly interacted directly with fans through online forums, early forms of social media, and weekly online chats. In 2003 this excitement coalesced into Grissecon, a convention held in Stafford, Constantine's hometown, for fans of Wraeththu and related fiction and topics. Subsequently Constantine participated in numerous conventions including Lunacon and Dragon Con in the US, plus many others in the UK.

Unlike some authors, Constantine was accepting of fan fiction, and once she began to read what her fans had written, actively encouraged it. Constantine used Immanion Press as a way of putting the work of talented fan fiction writers in print as fully-fledged novels. For the writers of these books, primarily amateurs, Constantine served both as editor and mentor. Immanion Press also published a series of Wraeththu short story anthologies featuring her own work as well as those of fan writers. The initial collection was published in 2010 and within ten years it was joined by five others.

Reflecting on fan fiction, Constantine explained that the concept of a shared world inspiring new works was one she herself had embraced as a child. In a 2016 interview, she expounded on her attitude:

It was brought to my attention that a small community had arisen devoted to writing Wraeththu fanfic. The main reason these writers had turned to my Mythos was because they'd been hounded out of another one by a famous writer who strongly objected to their activities. A fanfic writer mailed me about this and asked for my opinion, and what I felt about fan fiction set in a world I'd invented and about which I still continued to write. I thought about it for some time, and realized that I didn't feel offended at all. As far as I could see, it was similar to a time in my childhood when I'd also invented make-believe worlds – avidly – and the more friends I could get to share in that make-believe and play in my world, the better. This to me was the same. People were coming to play in my garden with me. Why should that be offensive? Could I ever stop people imagining these stories? No. Hadn't I myself begun my writing life as a fanfic author – albeit writing 'sequels' to Greek and Roman myths as a child rather than an established author's work? I understood the impulse to add to an invented world, to want to play in it when the author had closed the gates for the night.

During the 2000s and 2010s, Constantine authored and published several more Wraeththu novels, contributed and/or edited numerous short story collections, and put out several non-fiction works. She was also primary editor on dozens of books published by Immanion Press. She laid out many books, including her own, for publication, formatting text, setting up artwork, and preparing the final file to be sent to the printer.

Constantine lived in Stafford her entire life and enjoyed a long marriage with Jim Hibbert. They lived in a Victorian terrace house they restored and shared their lives with a menagerie of cats.

Death 
Constantine died aged  on 14 January 2021, after a long illness.

Multi-part novels

Wraeththu Chronicles 
 The Enchantments of Flesh and Spirit (1987)
 The Bewitchments of Love and Hate (1988)
 The Fulfilments of Fate and Desire (1989)
 Other editions:
 Wraeththu (omnibus) published by Tor in 1993
 Revised editions of all three published by Immanion Press in 2003, 2007, and 2018 
 Der Zauber von Fleisch und Geist (German translation of The Enchantments of Flesh and Spirit) published by Zauberfeder Verlag in 2006

Artemis 
 The Monstrous Regiment (1991)
 Aleph (1991)

Grigori Trilogy 
 Stalking Tender Prey (1995)
 Scenting Hallowed Blood (1996)
 Stealing Sacred Fire (1997)

Magravandias 
 Sea Dragon Heir (1998)
 The Crown of Silence (2000)
 The Way of Light (2001)

Wraeththu histories 
 The Wraiths of Will and Pleasure (2003)
 The Shades of Time and Memory (2004)
 The Ghosts of Blood and Innocence (2005)

Alba Sulh sequence 
 The Hienama (2005)
 Student of Kyme  (2008)
 The Moonshawl (2014)

Stand-alone novels 
 Hermetech (1991)
 Burying the Shadow (1992)
 Sign for the Sacred (1993)
 Calenture (1994)
 Thin Air (1999)
 The Oracle Lips (1999)
 Silverheart (with Michael Moorcock) (2000)
 Blood, the Phoenix and a Rose: An Alchymical Triptych (2016)
 Breathe, My Shadow (2019)

Novellas
 The Thorn Boy (1999)

Short story collections

Sole author
 The Oracle Lips (1999)
 Three Heralds of the Storm (1997)
 Mythophidia (2008)
 Mythangelus (2009)
 Mytholumina (2010)
 Mythanimus (2011)
 Splinters of Truth (2016)
 Mythumbra (2018)
 A Raven Bound with Lilies: Stories of the Wraeththu Mythos (2017)

Contributor and editor
 Paragenesis: Stories of the Dawn of Wraeththu (2010) (with Wendy Darling)
 Para Imminence: Stories of the Future of Wraeththu (2012) (with Wendy Darling)
 Para Kindred: Enigmas of Wraeththu (2014) (with Wendy Darling)
 Night's Nieces: The Legacy of Tanith Lee (2015)
 Dark in the Day (2016) (with Paul Houghton)
 Para Animalia: Creatures of Wraeththu (2016) (with Wendy Darling)
 The Darkest Midnight in December (2017)
 Songs to Earth and Sky: Stories of the Seasons (2017)
 Para Spectral: Hauntings of Wraeththu (2018) (with Wendy Darling)
 Para Mort: Wraeththu Tales of Love and Death (2020) (with Wendy Darling)

Contributor
List of select story collections in which Constantine's works have appeared
 Digital Dreams (1990)
 Dante's Disciples (1991)
 Women of Wonder, the Contemporary Years: Science Fiction by Women from the 1970s to the 1990s (1995)
 The Crow: Shattered Lives & Broken Dreams (1999)
 Year's Best Fantasy (2001)
 The Mammoth Book of Vampire Stories by Women (2001)
 Ravens in the Library: Magic in the Bard's Name (2009)
 Magic: An Anthology of the Esoteric and Arcane (2012)
 Obsession: Tales of Irresistible Desire (2012)
 Blood Sisters: Vampire Stories by Women (audiobook) (2015)
 Dreams from the Witch House: Female Voices of Lovecraftian Horror (2016)
 Sirens and Other Daemon Lovers: Magical Tales of Love and Seduction (2002)
 Black Thorn, White Rose (Fairy Tale Anthologies Book 2) (2007)

Magical grimoires
 Wraeththu: Grimoire Dehara
Grimoire Dehara: Kaimana (2011)
Grimoire Dehara: Ulani (2016) (with Taylor Ellwood)
 Grimoire Dehara: Nahir Nuri (2017) (with Taylor Ellwood)
 Coming Forth By Day: A System of Khematic Magic (2019)

Miscellaneous Wraeththu books 
 From Enchantment to Fulfilment (role-playing Game) (with Gabriel Strange, Lydia Wood, 2005)
 Wraeththu: The Picture Book (photography based on Wraeththu books) (2007)

Non-fiction works 
 The Inward Revolution (with Deborah Benstead) (1998)
 Bast and Sekhmet: Eyes of Ra (with Elouise Coquio) (1999)
 Egyptian Birth Signs: The Secrets of the Ancient Egyptian Horoscope (2002)
 Sekhem Heka: A Natural Healing and Self Development System (2008)
 What a Long Strange Trip It's Been: Wilderness Tips for World of Warcraft (2011)
 Whatnots & Curios: A Selection of Articles and Reviews (2015)
 SHE: Primal Meetings with the Dark Goddess (2019) (with Andrew Collins)

References

External links 
 Official site
 Dreams of Dark Angels (author blog)
 Immanion Press
 Forever Wraeththu (fan fiction portal)

 
 

1956 births
2021 deaths
English fantasy writers
English science fiction writers
English women novelists
People from Stafford
British women short story writers
Women science fiction and fantasy writers
English women non-fiction writers